Yehor Demchenko (born 25 July 1997) is a Ukrainian professional footballer who plays as a midfielder for Metalist Kharkiv.

Career
Demchenko is a product of FC Metalurh Zaporizhzhia youth team system. His first trainer was Mykola Syenovalov.

He made his debut for Metalurh Zaporizhzhia in the Ukrainian Premier League in a match against FC Hoverla Uzhhorod on 8 August 2015.

In August 2016, he spent 2 weeks training with Japanese club Júbilo Iwata, but he wasn't signed. After his return from Japan, he trained with Olimpik Donetsk and signed contract with the club on 1 December 2016.

References

External links
 
 

1997 births
Living people
People from Zaporizhzhia Oblast
Ukrainian footballers
Ukrainian Premier League players
Ukrainian First League players
Ukrainian Second League players
FC Metalurh Zaporizhzhia players
FC Zorya Luhansk players
FC Bukovyna Chernivtsi players
FC Olimpik Donetsk players
FC Kramatorsk players
FC Kolos Kovalivka players
FC Metalist Kharkiv players
Association football midfielders
Sportspeople from Zaporizhzhia Oblast